Keep a Child Alive (KCA) is a nonprofit organization that provides healthcare, housing, and other support services to HIV/AIDS-affected communities in Africa and India. Co-founded by Leigh Blake and Alicia Keys, the organization aims to "realize the end of AIDS for children and families, by combating the physical, social and economic impacts of HIV." Keep a Child Alive organizes the annual fundraiser gala The Black Ball, established in 2004, where celebrities and philanthropists gather to support and raise awareness for the cause. Since the first Black Ball, the organization has raised over $28.7 million for HIV/AIDS treatment.

Background
KCA cofounder and President Leigh Blake was first inspired to start the initiative in 2003 after an encounter at the AIDS Research and Family Care Clinic, which she helped fund, in Mombasa, Kenya. A woman named Anne brought her three-year-old son Brine for medical care, refusing to leave until she received the "drugs that you have in America for your children". Blake, who had already become involved in the AIDS epidemic using her background in the music and film industry to co-found the Red Hot Organization and Artists Against AIDS Worldwide, told Anne that she would pay for the drugs. In so doing, the idea for Keep a Child Alive was born. The drugs were about $12,000 a year through the New York University Hospital AIDS Research Department, which at that time was overseeing care at the clinic through Dr. Shaffiq Essajee. It was not long before word started to spread and friends of Blake and Essajee offered to make contributions. The first donor was Peter Edge, and soon KCA co-founder and Global Ambassador Alicia Keys joined the cause, sponsoring children along with Iman and many others. In 2003, Keep a Child Alive was officially founded. The clinic in Kenya that led to Blake's vision became a model for other facilities that KCA now aspires to build throughout Africa and the developing world.

KCA cofounder Alicia Keys was first affected by the HIV/AIDS crisis at eight years old when her mother's friend died from the disease. She discovered first-hand the extensive impact of the AIDS epidemic years later when she visited South Africa, a trip that was the impetus to co-founding Keep a Child Alive. Keys had befriended AIDS activist Leigh Blake, who had reached out to her and helped raise her awareness to the global impact of HIV/AIDS. Keys and Leigh visited South African clinics with HIV-infected mothers and children, where Keys encountered the lack of resources and education on the disease present in the communities. Keys visited other African countries such as Uganda and Kenya to promote care for children affected by AIDS. Her work in Africa was documented in the documentary Alicia in Africa: Journey to the Motherland.

The Mission
Keep a Child Alive brings attention to the already 30 million people that have been killed by AIDS in sub-Saharan Africa and the millions more that are threatened and orphaned by the disease. Currently there are 33.3 million people living with HIV/AIDS, including 2.3 million children under the age of 15. Despite AIDS being a preventable and treatable disease, 2.9 million people died from AIDS related causes last year, including 380,000 children under the age of 15—the equivalent of one child dying per minute.

KCA's efforts continue to focus in particular on sub-Saharan Africa as it remains the worst-affected region in the world. With a little more than one-tenth of the world's population living in this area, it is home to almost 64 percent of all people living with HIV—of the overall 24.5 million infected, 2 million are children. While access to ARV therapy has increased more than eightfold since the end of 2003, only 30 percent of people in need of treatment receive it.

In addition to improving access to ARV therapy, KCA offers a range of support services including nutritional projects, diagnostic testing, training of health care workers, counseling, and funding sites where AIDS orphans can be cared for. There are currently 14.9 million AIDS orphans in Africa alone, and 16.6 million worldwide.

Sites
Keep a Child Alive currently provides funding to ten clinical and orphan care sites in five countries: India, Kenya, Rwanda, Uganda and South Africa with past funding to additional projects in Ethiopia, Mali, India, Kenya, South Africa and Zimbabwe. With KCA funding, these projects have been successfully scaled to new levels of service and self-sustainability within their communities.

Campaigns
Spirit of a Child campaign was one of KCA's first major endeavors to engage the public through "groundbreaking advertising and media campaigns" that "reinvent the way the public perceives their role in the issue." The campaign, which was created for KCA by  TBWA/Chiat Day and photographed by Marc Baptiste, was launched on November 3, 2005, at the annual Black Ball fundraiser. "Spirit of a Child" is the brainchild of Patrick O'Neill and Nikki Weinstein and features the children of Agape Orphanage paired with such celebrities as Kanye West, David Byrne, Lorraine Bracco, Lenny Kravitz, Cynthia Nixon, Nas, John Legend and others.

I Am AfricanThe I Am African campaign stirred up controversy with its appropriation of tribal markings and face-paint worn by noted celebrities like Gisele Bündchen, Gwyneth Paltrow, David Bowie, Sarah Jessica Parker, and Sting. The concept was created in the summer of 2006 by model and cosmetics entrepreneur Iman to reflect the idea that Africa is the mother continent of all human beings. Photographed by Michael Thompson, the ads initially appeared in a fashion supplement to Condé Nast magazines in September and has since received both positive and negative attention in the press, blogs, and among other social activists.

Become A Drug DealerBecome A Drug Dealer is another KCA campaign that gives people the opportunity to purchase the drugs necessary to keep a child alive either by buying a T-shirt with the words Drug Dealer printed on it or making the typical monthly donation.

Buy LifeThe Buy Life campaign seeks to change consumer behavior, to reposition consumerism and the act of buying in the nonprofit environment through social media. With the tagline "The More You Buy, The More You Save", created by TBWA/Chiat Day, and photographed by Markus Klinko and Indrani, this series of portraits of notable celebrities in T-shirts with personalized scannable barcodes, turns the commercialism of celebrity packaging into a literal bar code that consumers can scan to buy life for the ultimate instant gratification. The campaign features celebrities including Katie Holmes, Kim Kardashian, Usher, Ryan Seacrest, Alicia Keys, Jaden and Willow Smith, Swizz Beatz, Serena Williams, and styling by GK Reid. KCA is the first charity to use barcode technology on smartphone devices to engage the public and encourage the purchase of life.

Digital Death The Digital Death campaign launched December 1, 2010, for World AIDS Day with shocking images of celebrities posed in coffins, photographed by Markus Klinko & Indrani, with taglines "Kim Kardashian is Dead", "Ryan Seacrest is Dead", etc. created by TBWA/Chiat Day. The image art is accompanied by performance art/interactive dimensions, with the stars sacrificing their digital lives on Twitter and Facebook until their fans donate one million dollars to buy their lives back. Among the other celebrities featured in the campaign were Alicia Keys, Lady Gaga, Justin Timberlake, Usher and Serena Williams. Daphne Guinness explains, "This campaign is so striking and draws attention not only to the AIDS disaster in Africa but also to how we have lost our way in what we care about." The million dollar donation goal was reached in six days.

Corporate Partners
KCA maintains that the reason it is able to give such a large percentage of monthly donations is because it relies on larger contributions from foundations, corporations, and major individual donors to support management and administrative costs. KCA's corporate partners include the Bill & Melinda Gates Foundation, Donna Karan, Time Warner Cable, and Maybelline.

Mobile Fundraising
In Fall 2008, Keep a Child Alive launched a mobile donating campaign with Co-Founder and Global Ambassador Alicia Keys. Keys raised over $40,000 in micro-donations by asking concert goers to text ALIVE to 90999. The mobile giving campaign was created through a partnership between Keep a Child Alive, the Mobile Giving Foundation and Mgive.

References

External links
 Keep a Child Alive - Official site

Alicia Keys
Medical and health organizations based in New York (state)
HIV/AIDS organizations in the United States
HIV/AIDS in Africa